This is a list of all United States Supreme Court cases from volume 343 of the United States Reports:

External links

1952 in United States case law